The "Syrian Islamic Liberation Front" ("SILF"; , "Jabhat Tahrīr Sūriya al-Islāmiyyah") was a coalition of the Islamist rebel brigades that fought against the Syrian regime in the Syrian Civil War. At the end of 2012, it was one of the strongest military coalitions in Syria, representing up to half of the rebel forces.

In late November 2013, Suqour al-Sham, Al-Tawhid Brigade and Jaysh al-Islam, the largest and most influential members of the Front, announced that they were joining the Islamic Front, greatly weakening SILF. On 25 November 2013, a statement appeared on the Front's website announcing that it was ceasing all operations. The Syrian Islamic Liberation Front was thought to be more moderate than the Ahrar al-Sham-led Syrian Islamic Front, and also closer Arab Gulf States than the Syrian Islamic Front which was closer to Turkey and Qatar.

Background
Founded in September 2012 after secret negotiations between the group's leaders, the group was headed by Ahmed Eissa al-Sheikh, the leader of the Suqour al-Sham Brigade. The coalition included around 20 Islamist groups and had tens of thousands of fighters active throughout much of Syria, overshadowing the Free Syrian Army (FSA) in some regions. While some member groups appeared to consider themselves members of both the Syrian Liberation Front and the FSA, Abu Issa said the group aimed to maintain brotherly relations with the FSA while declining to offer full support and criticising those leaders of the FSA that remained in Turkey.

The coalition included some of the most important rebel units active in the civil war, including the Suqour al-Sham Brigade (Idlib), Farouq Brigade (Homs), Liwa al-Islam (Damascus) and Tawhid Brigade (Aleppo). Other prominent groups in the coalition included Liwa Dawud, the Deir ez-Zor Revolutionary Council (Deir ez-Zor), Tajamo Ansar al-Islam (Damascus), Amr Ibn al-Aas Brigade (Aleppo), al-Naser Salaheddin Brigade (Latakia), and the Conquest Brigade (Aleppo). These groups were geographically scattered, varied in size and influence, and were dependent on different sources of funding. It was unclear how effectively the coalition coordinated between the varying groups.

Weapons
Abu Issa said that the coalition obtained their weapons from attacks on the Syrian Armed Forces and from arms dealers inside and outside Syria, however, the group reportedly received support from Turkey and Qatar. It had been accused by members of the FSA of monopolizing the supply of weapons through Turkey in order to marginalize unaffiliated rebel groups.

Ideology
The group had a Sunni Islamist ideology. It included both Muslim Brotherhood and Salafist inspired groups, however many of the more hardline Islamist groups active in the Syrian civil war were members of the Syrian Islamic Front. The group did not include the jihadist Al-Nusra Front, and Ahrar ash-Sham withdrew from the group in protest at the killing of a jihadist leader by one of the other groups. Some in the FSA criticized the group for its emphasis on an Islamic identity in a religiously mixed country. The group had a minimalist political platform, promising to protect minorities and stating that religious Muslim law was the point of reference for the group. In July 2013, the leader of the group called for sectarian attacks on Alawite homes and villages, but retracted the statement weeks later.

See also
List of armed groups in the Syrian Civil War

References

External links
  

Anti-government factions of the Syrian civil war
2012 establishments in Syria
Politics of Syria
Guerrilla organizations